Ølmheim Church is a parish church of the Church of Norway in Sogndal Municipality in Vestland county, Norway. It is located in the village of Nornes, on the northern shore of the Sogndalsfjorden. It is the church for the Norum parish which is part of the Sogn prosti (deanery) in the Diocese of Bjørgvin. The white, wooden church was built in a long church design in 1863 using plans drawn up by the architect Christian Henrik Grosch. The church seats about 230 people.

History
The earliest existing historical records of the church date back to the year 1308, but the church was not new that year. Sometime before 1686, the old choir was torn down and a new timber-framed choir was built to replace it. The old church was in use until 1700 or 1701 when it burned down. A new cruciform church was built in 1703 to replace it. The new church was built by Askild Tepstad. The new building was designed by Christian Henrik Grosch and the lead builder was Ole Olson Løken. After the new building was completed, the old church was torn down.

On 15 January 1989, lightning struck the tower and it started burning. The fire department was alerted and arrived quickly enough that they had extinguished the fire before the whole church was destroyed. The tower was rebuilt in the autumn of the same year, and it looks the same as before.

Name
Historically, the church had been called Ylmheim Church (or Ølmheim Church), after the name of the nearby farm. However, starting around the year 1840, the church and the parish were named Norum. In 2015, the church was renamed using the historic Ølmheim name, but the parish name remained as Norum.

See also
List of churches in Bjørgvin

References

Sogndal
Churches in Vestland
Long churches in Norway
Wooden churches in Norway
19th-century Church of Norway church buildings
Churches completed in 1863
13th-century establishments in Norway